Avraham Elmalih (1885 – 2 April 1967) was a journalist, Zionist activist and Israeli politician.

Biography
Born in Jerusalem, Elmalih was educated in a yeshiva and an alliance school. He studied at the Archaeological Institute and worked as a teacher in his home city, as well as in Istanbul, Jaffa and Damascus. In 1914, Elmalih established the Herut newspaper, editing it until 1919. During World War I, he was exiled to Damascus.

In 1920, he was elected to the Assembly of Representatives for Histadrut HaSephardim, and the following year joined the Jewish National Council. In 1921, he became a member of the editorial board of the Doar Hayom newspaper, serving until 1932. In 1928, Elmaliah published a book entitled The Land of Israel and Syria during WWI. In 1935, he became a member of Jerusalem city council.

Following Israeli independence, he was elected to the first Knesset in 1949 on the Sephardim and Oriental Communities. He lost his seat in the 1951 elections.

References

External links
 

1885 births
1967 deaths
People from Jerusalem
Israeli educators
Israeli journalists
Members of the Assembly of Representatives (Mandatory Palestine)
Members of the 1st Knesset (1949–1951)
Sephardim and Oriental Communities politicians
Sephardi Jews in Mandatory Palestine
Sephardi Jews in Ottoman Palestine
20th-century journalists